The 2015 FIVB Volleyball World Grand Prix was the 23rd edition of the annual women's international volleyball tournament played by 28 countries from 26 June to 2 August 2015. This was the first time that the Group 1 final round was held in Omaha, Nebraska, United States.

Qualification
 All 28 teams of the 2014 edition directly qualified.
  withdrew from the tournament.
  qualified through the 2014 Pan-American Cup.

|

|

|}

Format
 The second time the World Grand Prix will feature 28 teams.
 During the Intercontinental Round, Pools A to O will play matches in three stand-alone tournaments, for a total of 9 matches per team. Pool P to S will feature two stand-alone tournaments, for a total of 6 matches per team.
 Six teams will qualify for the World Grand Prix Finals featuring the top five teams from all matches (if the hosts are one of the top five teams, then the sixth top team also participates).
 The last ranked team of Group 1 after the Intercontinental Round could be relegated if the winner of the Final Four of Group 2 can meet the promotion requirements set by the FIVB.

Pools composition
The pools composition was announced on 1 December 2014.

Competition schedule

Squads
There are 25 players in team rosters. Maximum of 12 regular players and maximum of 2 liberos can be selected to play in each week. The full rosters of 25 players of each team can be seen in the article below.

Pool standing procedure
 Number of matches won
 Match points
 Sets ratio
 Points ratio
 If the tie continues as per the point ratio between two teams, the priority will be given to the team which won the last match between them. When the tie in points ratio is between three or more teams, a new classification of these teams in the terms of points 1, 2 and 3 will be made taking into consideration only the matches in which they were opposed to each other.

Match won 3–0 or 3–1: 3 match points for the winner, 0 match points for the loser
Match won 3–2: 2 match points for the winner, 1 match point for the loser

Intercontinental round
 All times are local.

Group 1

Ranking

|}

Week 2

Pool A
 Venue:  Indoor Stadium Huamark, Bangkok, Thailand

|}

Pool B
 Venue:  Beilun Gymnasium, Ningbo, China

|}

Pool C
 Venue:  Başkent Volleyball Hall, Ankara, Turkey

|}

Week 3

Pool D
 Venue:  Ginásio do Ibirapuera, São Paulo, Brazil

|}

Pool E
 Venue:  Saitama City Memorial Gymnasium, Saitama, Japan

|}

Pool F
 Venue:  DS Yantarny, Kaliningrad, Russia

|}

Week 4

Pool G
 Venue:  PalaCatania, Catania, Italy

|}

Pool H
 Venue:  Hong Kong Coliseum, Hong Kong, China

|}

Pool I
 Venue:  Porsche-Arena, Stuttgart, Germany

|}

Group 2

Ranking

|}

Week 2

Pool J
 Venue:  Žatika Sport Centre, Porec, Croatia

|}

Pool K
 Venue:  Guillermo Angulo Coliseum, Carolina, Puerto Rico

|}

Week 3

Pool L
 Venue:  Estadio Cincuentenario, Formosa, Argentina

|}

Pool M
 Venue:  Arena Samokov, Samokov, Bulgaria

|}

Group 3

Ranking

|}

Week 1

Pool N
 Venue:  Zhastar Sports Palace, Taldykorgan, Kazakhstan

|}

Pool O
 Venue:  Gimnasio Nuevo León, Monterrey, Mexico

|}

Week 2

Pool P
 Venue:  Coliseo Gran Chimu, Trujillo, Peru

|}

Pool Q
 Venue:  Salle omnisports Cheraga, Chéraga, Algeria

|}

Final round

Group 3
 Venue:  AIS Arena, Canberra, Australia
 All times are Australian Eastern Standard Time (UTC+10:00).

Week 3 (Final four)

Semifinals

|}

3rd place match

|}

Final

|}

Group 2
 Venue:  Hala Globus, Lublin, Poland
 All times are Central European Summer Time (UTC+02:00).

Week 6 (Final four)

Semifinals

|}

3rd place match

|}

Final

|}

Group 1

Week 5 (Final Six)
 Venue:  CenturyLink Center Omaha, Omaha, Nebraska, United States
 All times are Central Daylight Time (UTC−05:00).

|}

|}

Final standing

Awards

 Most Valuable Player
  Karsta Lowe
 Best Outside Hitters
  Natalia Pereira
  Kelsey Robinson
 Best Setter
  Molly Kreklow

 Best Middle Blockers
  Juciely Cristina Barreto
  Christa Harmotto
 Best Libero
  Anna Malova
 Best Opposite
  Nataliya Obmochaeva

Statistics

The statistics of each group follows the vis reports P2 and P3. The statistics include 6 volleyball skills, serve, receive, set, spike, block, and dig. The table below shows the top 5 ranked players in each skill plus top scorers as of 2 August 2015.

Best scorers
The best scorers determined by players who scored points from spike, block, and serve.

Best spikers
The best spikers determined by players who successfully spike in percentage (%success).

Best blockers
The best scorers determined by players who had the most numbers of stuff block divided by numbers of sets which her team played (average stuff block/set).

Best servers
The best scorers determined by players who had the most numbers of ace serve divided by numbers of sets which her team played (average ace serve/set).

Best setters
The best scorers determined by players who had the most numbers of running set divided by numbers of sets which her team played (average running set/set).

Best diggers
The best scorers determined by players who had the most numbers of excellent dig divided by numbers of sets which her team played (average excellent dig/set).

Best receivers
The best scorers determined by numbers of excellent receive minus fault receive in percentage (%efficient).

References

External links
 Official Website

FIVB World Grand Prix
International volleyball competitions hosted by the United States
Sports competitions in Omaha, Nebraska
FIVB World Grand Prix
FIVB Volleyball World Grand Prix
Volleyball in Nebraska